Miedziane may refer to the following places in Poland:
Miedziane, Lower Silesian Voivodeship in Gmina Sulików, Zgorzelec County in Lower Silesian Voivodeship (SW Poland)
Miedziane, a peak in the Polish High Tatras